The Cheongju Jeong clan is one of the Korean clans. Their bon-gwan is Cheongju, North Chungcheong Province. According to a census from 2015, the population of the Cheongju Jeong clan is 46,419.  Their founder was Jeong Geuk-gyeong(), who was a military officer during the Goryeo dynasty. One of his descendants was the Joseon dynasty Neo-Confucian scholar, Jeong Gu.

See also 
 Jeong (surname)

References

External links 

 
Jeong clans